Claude Louis, Comte de Saint-Germain (15 April 1707 – 15 January 1778), French general, was born on 15 April 1707, at the Château of Vertamboz.

Educated at Jesuit schools, he intended to enter the priesthood, but at the last minute obtained from Louis XV an appointment as sub-lieutenant. He left France, according to the gossip of the time, because of a duel; served under the Elector Palatine; fought for Hungary against the Turks, and on the outbreak of the war of the Austrian Succession (1740) joined the army of the elector of Bavaria (who later became emperor under the name of Charles VII), displaying such bravery that he was promoted to the grade of lieutenant field-marshal.

He left Bavaria on the death of Charles VII, and after brief service under Frederick the Great joined Marshal Saxe in the Netherlands and was created a field-marshal of the French army. He distinguished himself especially at Lauffeld, Rocoux and Maastricht. On the outbreak of the Seven Years' War (1756) he was appointed lieutenant-general, and although he showed greater ability than any of his fellow-commanders and was admired by his soldiers, he fell a victim to court intrigues, professional jealousy and hostile criticism. He resigned his commission in 1760 and accepted an appointment as field-marshal from Frederick V of Denmark-Norway, being charged in 1762 with the reorganization of the Danish army.

In 1767, he and his circle, wished to make Birgitte Sofie Gabel the official mistress of Christian VII of Denmark-Norway in order to divert him from politics and take over the de facto power over the government themselves. The plan failed because Gabel did not wish to become the king's mistress, as she found him repulsive and was in love with Prince Charles of Hesse-Kassel, and the same year, Støvlet-Cathrine became the king's official mistress instead.

He soon returned to France, bought a small estate in Alsace near Lauterbach (close to Mulhouse), and devoted his time to religion and farming. A financial crisis swept away the funds that he had saved from his Danish service and rendered him dependent on the bounty of the French ministry of war. Saint-Germain was presented at court by the reformers Turgot and Malesherbes, and was appointed minister of war by Louis XVI on 25 October 1775. He sought to lessen the number of officers and to establish order and regularity in the service. His efforts to introduce Prussian discipline in the French army brought on such opposition that he resigned in September 1777. He accepted quarters from the king and a pension of 40,000 livres, and died in his apartment at the Arsenal of Paris on 15 January 1778.

References

Attribution:
 

1707 births
1778 deaths
French generals
Secretaries of State for War (France)
French expatriates in Denmark
French Roman Catholics